Cas2 is a protein associated with CRISPR that is involved with spacer acquisition. Representative cas2 proteins have been characterized as endonucleases that cleave single-stranded RNAs preferentially within U-rich regions,  or as metal-dependent endonucleases targeting double-stranded (ds)DNA

References 

Enzymes